Pe htaw bhut htamin (also known as butter rice or butter and lentil rice) is a festive rice dish in Burmese cuisine, typically associated with celebratory occasions like wedding receptions or almsgiving feasts. The rice dish is typically paired with a traditional Burmese chicken or mutton curry.

Ingredients 
Buttered rice uses long-grained paw hsan hmwe or basmati rice, and in its most basic form, is cooked with butter, lentils, and bay leaves. Cashew nuts and raisins may be added, and the dish can be spiced with cinnamon sticks, cardamom pods or cloves, and garnished with fried golden onions to serve.

See also
 List of rice dishes

References

Burmese cuisine
Rice dishes
Foods featuring butter